Daniel Benjamin Califf (born March 17, 1980 in Orange, California) is an American retired soccer player.

Career

Youth and College
Califf (pronounced kāl'ĭ-f) started his youth career in soccer for Canyon Hills Soccer Association, playing on the Canyon Classic team coached by his father. He played college soccer at the University of Maryland from 1998 to 2000. As a freshman, he started all 24 of the team's games, and was named to the Soccer America All-Freshman team for helping to lead the Terrapins to the Final Four. In his second year of college, he started 20 games, and was named an NSCAA third-team All-American.

Professional
After his sophomore season, Califf signed a Project-40 contract with MLS and entered the 2000 MLS SuperDraft, where he was selected sixth overall by the Los Angeles Galaxy. Califf was immediately slotted into the Galaxy's starting line up, appearing in 18 games, 16 of them starts, as a rookie. Over the next three years, Califf would establish himself as one of the best central defenders in the league, starting 69 games for the Galaxy while helping the team to win a U.S. Open Cup in 2001 and a MLS Cup in 2002. Califf struggled with injuries in 2004, and was able to make only 10 starts, playing 855 minutes.

Califf was traded to the San Jose Earthquakes for an allocation prior to the 2005 season. He then regained his old form and even improved, being named to the MLS Best XI for the first time. Califf has scored seven league goals and four assists in six years in MLS.

He left the Quakes after just one season to sign with Aalborg in the Danish Superliga. In his first full season at Aalborg, Califf played 30 of 33 games, and helped the team win bronze medals in the 2006–07 Superliga season. Califf scored his first Aalborg goal on the last match day of the season, as bronze medal contenders Odense BK were defeated 3–1. After the season, during AaB's Intertoto Cup campaign, Califf was named club captain. In the 2007–08 Superliga season he helped Aalborg to a gold medal but after the season he could not agree with Aalborg on a new contract. He eventually signed with Danish Superliga rivals Midtjylland.

On December 3, 2009, the Philadelphia Union announced that they had acquired Califf's MLS rights from Houston Dynamo and that he would join the team for their inaugural 2010 season. Before the Union's first game against Seattle Sounders FC he was announced as the team's captain. Califf scored his first goal for the Union in the 2011 MLS season opener win against Houston Dynamo on March 19, 2011. He was named to the MLS Team of the week for this performance that match also. On June 8, Califf was named a nominee for the MLS All-Star Game. It was announced that he was fifth in defender voting for the All-Star Game.

On May 17, 2012, Califf was traded to Chivas USA for Michael Lahoud and allocation money. At the end of the 2012 season, Chivas USA declined Califf's contract option and he entered the 2012 MLS Re-Entry Draft. On December 14, 2012, Califf was selected by Toronto FC with the first pick of stage two of the draft and that day signed a contract with Toronto for the 2013 season.

Retirement
Califf announced his retirement from soccer on July 12, 2013. 

In 2014, Califf became an assistant coach under Charlie Dodds, President of YSC Sports, home of the Philadelphia Union Academy. After one year of coaching at YSC Sports, he returned to Toronto FC as a scout through 2016. 

Califf has settled back in his hometown of Orange, CA with his family. Currently, he is the Founder and President of his own personal training company, Professional Soccer Resource (PSR) and holds the title of Technical Director for the youth soccer club Boca O.C.

International
Califf has played for the United States national team at every level from the U-17's to the senior team. He has appeared in the 1997 FIFA U-17 World Championship, the 1999 World Youth Championship in Egypt, and the 2000 Sydney Olympics . Additionally, he has appeared in 26 games for the full national team, getting his first cap against South Korea on January 19, 2002.

Califf played in the  2003 & 2009 Confederations Cup, the 2002, 2003, & 2009 Gold Cups and the 2007 Copa America.  

He served as captain twice for the team on July 5, 2007, when the United States lost 1–0 to Colombia during their final group game in Venezuela (2007 Copa America) and again in 2009 With a win against Sweden in Carson, CA.

International goals
He scored his only international goal against Haiti on March 16, 2004.

Honors

United States
CONCACAF Gold Cup (2):  2002, 2003, &  2005

Los Angeles Galaxy
CONCACAF Champions Cup (1): 2000
Defender of the Year: 2000
Lamar Hunt U.S. Open Cup (1): 2001
Major League Soccer MLS Cup (1): 2002
Major League Soccer Supporters' Shield (1): 2002
Major League Soccer Western Conference Championship (1): 2002

San Jose Earthquakes
Major League Soccer Supporters' Shield (1): 2005
 MLS BEST XI  2005
MLS ALL-STAR 2005

Aalborg
Danish Superliga Champion(1): 2007–08

Individual
MLS Best XI: 2005
MLS ALL-STAR: 2005

Career statistics
Updated July 12, 2013

References

External links

FC Midtjylland profile
AaB profile 
Official Superliga stats

1980 births
Living people
People from Montclair, California
American soccer players
Soccer players from California
Sportspeople from San Bernardino County, California
United States men's international soccer players
Olympic soccer players of the United States
Maryland Terrapins men's soccer players
LA Galaxy players
MLS Pro-40 players
San Jose Earthquakes players
AaB Fodbold players
FC Midtjylland players
Philadelphia Union players
Chivas USA players
Toronto FC players
A-League (1995–2004) players
Major League Soccer players
Danish Superliga players
Footballers at the 2000 Summer Olympics
2002 CONCACAF Gold Cup players
2003 FIFA Confederations Cup players
2003 CONCACAF Gold Cup players
2007 Copa América players
2009 FIFA Confederations Cup players
CONCACAF Gold Cup-winning players
American expatriate soccer players
Expatriate men's footballers in Denmark
Expatriate soccer players in Canada
Association football central defenders
Major League Soccer All-Stars
United States men's youth international soccer players
United States men's under-20 international soccer players
United States men's under-23 international soccer players
LA Galaxy draft picks
American expatriate sportspeople in Denmark
American expatriate sportspeople in Canada
Pan American Games bronze medalists for the United States
Footballers at the 1999 Pan American Games
Medalists at the 1999 Pan American Games
Pan American Games medalists in football